Nest of Vipers is a 1978 Italian drama film directed by Tonino Cervi.   
Based on the 1949 short story La maîtresse de piano (The Piano Teacher) by Roger Peyrefitte and set in Venice under fascism, its themes include illicit sex, betrayal, revenge, blackmail, perjury, police corruption and murder.

Plot
In Venice in the 1930s, Mattia, a young man of modest background, arrives to take up a piano scholarship at the conservatory. He makes friends with another student, Renato, whose vivacious widowed mother, Carla, is short of money and survives by giving piano lessons. Mattia and Carla start a passionate affair in secret. However Renato, who is unhealthily close to his mother, gets suspicious and Mattia breaks it off abruptly. Carla is deeply hurt at this betrayal and nurses a desire for revenge.

Her plan for Renato is to marry him to one of her students, Elena, daughter of a rich family, and she arranges a dinner party for Elena and her brother. Renato invites Mattia as well, with the result that Elena and Mattia are instantly attracted to each other. Mattia walks back with Elena and her brother to the palazzo they live in as a ferocious storm breaks out. Invited to stay the night in a spare room and lent a pair of pyjamas, he and Elena are able to start a secret physical relationship. Accepted by the family, soon the two are engaged.

In revenge, Carla sends an anonymous letter to Elena's parents, but Mattia recognises her writing and the result is they ban her from giving Elena further lessons. Carla begs Elena to come to her flat for an explanation and, when she turns up, seduces her. Afterwards, as Elena is lying happily in bed, Carla brutally says that the sex was just to discredit her and will be publicised unless the engagement is broken. Horrified, Elena strikes at her until she falls dead. The police suspect Mattia, who has not got a good alibi, until Elena saves him by claiming she was in his room with him at the time of the killing. Her father helps by saying he will find a good job for the police commissioner's son if Elena's confession is kept quiet. So Mattia has to marry a perjurer and a murderess and, as they emerge from the church, a gondola goes past carrying only a coffin.

Cast 
Senta Berger: Carla Richter
Ornella Muti: Elena Mazzarini
Mattia Sbragia: Edoardo Mazzarini
Stefano Patrizi: Mattia Morandi
Capucine: Amalia Mazzarini
Paolo Bonacelli: Riccardo Mazzarini
Giuliana Calandra: Conservatory teacher
Giancarlo Sbragia: Maffei, the patriarch
Maria Monti: Linda
Eros Pagni: Police Commissioner
Christian Borromeo: Renato Richter

Release 
The film, which has an 18 rating, was released on DVD in 2012.

References

External links

Ritratto di borghesia in nero (1978) at cb01.eu, with video clip

1978 films
Italian drama films
Films directed by Tonino Cervi
Films set in the 1930s
1978 drama films
1970s Italian films